Borislav Pavlov (Bulgarian: Борислав Павлов) (born 6 January 1978) is a Bulgarian football midfielder who plays for Slivnishki Geroi. He is a central defender or defensive midfielder.

He had previously played for CSKA Sofia, Spartak Pleven and Slavia Sofia.

References

1978 births
Living people
Bulgarian footballers
PFC Velbazhd Kyustendil players
PFC Cherno More Varna players
PFC Spartak Pleven players
PFC Slavia Sofia players
OFC Vihren Sandanski players
FC Chernomorets Balchik players
First Professional Football League (Bulgaria) players
Association football defenders
People from Sandanski
Sportspeople from Blagoevgrad Province